The Canton of Angers-Nord-Ouest is a French former administrative division, located in the arrondissement of Angers, in the Maine-et-Loire département (Pays de la Loire région). It had 20,934 inhabitants (2012). It was disbanded following the French canton reorganisation which came into effect in March 2015.

Composition 
The canton of Angers-Nord-Ouest comprised the following communes:

Angers (partly)
Avrillé

See also
Cantons of the Maine-et-Loire department
Communes of the Maine-et-Loire department

References

Former cantons of Maine-et-Loire
Canton of Angers-Nord-Ouest
2015 disestablishments in France
States and territories disestablished in 2015